South Lansing is a census-designated place (CDP) in the town of Lansing, Tompkins County, New York, United States. The CDP includes the hamlets of South Lansing, Terpening Corners, and Asbury. The area was first listed as a CDP prior to the 2020 census.

The community is in northern Tompkins County, southeast of the geographic center of the town of Lansing. It is the location of the Lansing Town Hall. New York State Route 34 passes through the community, leading north  to Auburn and south through the village of Lansing  to Ithaca. State Route 34B joins Route 34 briefly in South Lansing but heads east  to Route 38 between Groton and Freeville, while to the west it soon turns and runs parallel to Route 34, rejoining it in Fleming.

Demographics

References 

Census-designated places in Tompkins County, New York
Census-designated places in New York (state)